Joseph Hughes (born 1898) was a Welsh professional footballer who played as a goalkeeper.

References

1898 births
People from Tylorstown
Sportspeople from Rhondda Cynon Taf
Welsh footballers
Association football goalkeepers
Bristol City F.C. players
Grimsby Town F.C. players
English Football League players
Year of death missing
Footballers from Bristol